Fiona is a feminine given name. The name is associated with the Gaelic traditions of Ireland and Scotland (through the poetry of James Macpherson), but has also become popular in England. It can be considered either a Latinised form of the Gaelic word fionn, meaning "white", "fair", or an Anglicisation of the Irish name Fíona (derived from an element meaning "vine"). The Scottish Gaelic feminine name Fionnghal (and variants) is sometimes equated with Fiona. In ninth-century Welsh and Breton language 'Fion' (today: 'ffion') referred to the foxglove species and is also a female given name as in Ffion Hague.

Fiona was the 49th most popular name for baby girls born in 2008 in Germany. Fiona was tied for third place in the ranking of most popular names for baby girls born in Liechtenstein in 2008. The name was the 347th most popular name for girls born in the United States in 2008, where it has ranked among the top 1,000 most popular names for girls since 1990 and among the top 500 since 1999. The name Fiona has been particularly popular for girls of Asian or Pacific Islander descent in New York City, where Fiona ranked as the ninth most popular name for girls from those groups in 2007.

Notable people with this name
Fiona (1960), singer, born Fiona Flanagan
Fiona Alpass, New Zealand academic
Fiona Apple (1977), American singer
Fiona Balfour, Australian business executive in the field of information technology
Fiona Bloom (1969), publicist
Fiona Bruce (1964), BBC presenter
Fiona Campbell-Walter (1932), British model
Fiona Crombie (1973), Australian costume and production designer
Fiona Dourif (1981), American actress
Fiona Fairhurst (1971), inventor of the Speedo Fastskin swimsuit
Fiona Ferro (1997), French tennis player
Melanie Fiona (1983), Canadian singer
Fiona Fullerton (1956), English actress
Fiona Fung (1983), Hong Kong singer
Fiona Gubelmann, American actress
Fiona Hammond (1983), Australian water polo player
Fiona Highet, Scottish entomologist
Fiona Hill (1965), British-American foreign affairs specialist
Fiona McLeod Hill (1973), British political adviser
Fiona McLeod (1964), Australian prominent barrister and Labor politician
Fiona Kennedy, Scottish singer
Fiona Krautil (1956), Australian specialist in inclusion, diversity and equal opportunity in the workplace
Fiona MacDonald (1974), Scottish curler
Fiona J. Mackenzie, Scottish Gaelic singer
Fiona Mactaggart (1953), British politician
Fiona May (1969), English-Italian athlete and actress
Fiona McFarlane (1978), Australian author
Fiona Millar (1958), British author and journalist
Fiona O'Donnell (1960), Scottish politician
Fiona O'Driscoll, Irish camogie player
Fiona O'Loughlin (1963), Australian stand-up comedian
Fiona O'Loughlin (1965), Irish politician
Fiona O'Malley (1968), Irish politician
Fiona O'Shaughnessy (1979), Irish actor
Fiona O'Sullivan (1986), Irish footballer
Fiona Onasanya (1983), British politician 
Fiona Phillips (1961), British journalist and broadcaster
Fiona Pitt-Kethley (1954), British poet, novelist and journalist
Fiona Richmond (1945), English glamour model
Fiona Ritchie (1960), American broadcaster 
Fiona Robertson (born 1969), Scottish judoka and wrester
Fiona Robinson (1969), Australian basketball and handball player
Fiona M. Scott Morton, American Professor of Economics 
Fiona Shaw (1958), Irish actress
Fiona Sit (1981), Hong Kong Cantonese singer
Fiona Staples, comic book artist
Fiona Watt, British children's author
Fiona Xie (1982), Singaporean television actress

Fictional characters
 Princess Fiona, the female lead and a major character in the Shrek franchise
 Fiona, stepmother of Sam Montgomery in the 2004 film A Cinderella Story
 Fiona in Lemony Snicket's A Series of Unfortunate Events
 Fiona, a character in Dead or Alive Xtreme 3
 Fiona, a character in Xenoblade Chronicles 3
 Fiona in the film EuroTrip
 Fiona, main character in the film Josie and the Pussycats
 Fiona, a character in Kid vs. Kat
 Fiona, one of the regular characters in Round the Horne
 Fiona, main character in the television series So Weird
 Fiona, leader of the rebel mages in Dragon Age: Inquisition
 Fiona, a main player-character from the Tales from the Borderlands video game
 Fiona, the closest friend of Jonas in Lois Lowry's 1993 novel The Giver
 Fiona, a playable character in the Free-to-play game Vindictus
 Fiona of Fort Weyr, Telgar Weyrwoman in Dragon's Time by Anne and Todd McCaffrey
 Fionna, the gender-swapped version of Finn in Adventure Time
Fiona Bayar, an antagonist in The Seven Realms series
 Fiona/Black Fairy in the TV series Once Upon a Time
Fiona Belli, protagonist in the game Haunting Ground
Fiona Callahan, a character in the CW show Charmed
Fiona Carter in the BBC show Spooks
 Fiona Cat, Huckle Cat's mother from The Busy World of Richard Scarry
Fiona "Fee" Cleary, matriarch of the Cleary family in the novel and mini-series The Thorn Birds
 Fiona Conneely, main character in The Secret of Roan Inish
Fiona Coyne, a character in the Canadian television series Degrassi: The Next Generation
 Fiona Fennec, a character in the comic Kevin and Kell 
 Fiona Flagstaff, a Spinosaurus character in DinoSquad
Fiona Fox, a character in the Sonic the Hedgehog comics by Archie Comics
Fiona Gallagher, a character in the television drama Shameless
 Fiona Gilman, a character in the video game Identity V
Fiona Glenanne, a main character in the television show Burn Notice
Fiona Goode, a character in American Horror Story: Coven
 Fiona Hackworth in the book The Diamond Age
 Fiona Kerr, a "notorious wet" in the novel The Passion Flower Hotel
 Fiona Linette, a character in the anime series Zoids: Chaotic Century
 Fiona Maxwell, one of the main characters in the 1993 novel Tomorrow, When the War Began
 Fiona Mayfield, a character in the video game series Arcana Heart
 Fiona McLaren, the main female character in the Broadway musical Brigadoon
 Lady Fiona McTarry, the alias of Agent Mimi in the James Bond spoof Casino Royale
 Fiona Pitch, aunt of Baz Grimm-Pitch in Rainbow Rowell's 2015 novel Carry On
 Fiona Volpe, an assassin in the film Thunderball
 Fiona Wallice, a character in the television and web series Web Therapy
Princess Fiona, sorceress in The Chronicles of Amber novels 
Fiona Fraunfeld, a main character in Ransom Riggs' 2001 book Miss Peregrine's Home for Peculiar Children

Other
Fiona (hippopotamus), first Nile hippo imaged on ultrasound pre-natally

See also
List of Irish-language given names

References

Feminine given names
English feminine given names
Irish feminine given names
Scottish feminine given names